San Francisco de Asís Mission Church is a historic and architecturally significant building on the main plaza of Ranchos de Taos, New Mexico.  Originally the center of a small Mexican and Indian 18th Century agricultural community. Built between 1772 and 1816 replacing an earlier church in that location. New Mexico was then part of the Vice-Royalty of New Spain. It is a fine example of a New Mexico Spanish Colonial Church, and is a popular subject for artists.  It was designated a National Historic Landmark in 1970.

Description
An adobe wall extends from the back of the church and one of the transepts to form an enclosed rectangular area on the building's south side. Adobe buttresses project from several portions of the main walls, including architecturally distinctive beehive-curved buttresses at the ends of the transepts. The roof is formed out of adobe laid on planking supported by timber vigas, set in distinctive doubly corbelled mounts. The vigas are also more closely spaced than is typically found in other examples of Spanish colonial architecture. The entrance is flanked by a pair of bell towers.

History
The mission at Ranchos de Taos was established in the early 18th century.  Initial construction began circa 1772 and completed in 1815 by The Franciscan Fathers; its patron is Saint Francis of Assisi. It was the center of the fortified plaza, which provided for protection against Comanche attacks.  The church has undergone several restorations or subsequent works in 1850, 1916 and 1933. Including a thorough restoration in 1967. In 1967 a new roof was placed over the structure and all the ceiling beams (vigas) and most of the corbels were replaced with copies of the original.  The doors were also replaced with copies of the original design. The original sanctuary woodwork was left intact. The community and parishioners gather annually to earthen plaster the church.

Representation
The church has inspired some of the greatest number of depictions of any building in the United States. It was the subject of several paintings by Georgia O'Keeffe, and photographs by Ansel Adams, Paul Strand and Ned Scott. Georgia O'Keeffe described it as "one of the most beautiful buildings left in the United States by the early Spaniards."

The Taos Chamber of Commerce states that the building is "one of the most photographed and painted churches in the world".

The church was designated a National Historic Landmark in 1970. It is also designated as a World Heritage church.

Historic Photographs

Gallery

See also 

National Register of Historic Places listings in Taos County, New Mexico
List of National Historic Landmarks in New Mexico
New Mexico State Register of Cultural Properties (Registration no. 24)

References

Further reading 
Spirit and Vision: Images of Ranchos de Taos Church. 1987, Museum of New Mexico Press. . 80 images of the church, from a 1982 exhibition at the Museum of Fine Arts, Santa Fe.
 
 Hooker, Van Dorn. Centuries of Hands: An Architectural History of St. Francis of Assisi Church, Sunstone Press 1996, .

External links 

Vintage Ranchos de Taos Photos by Ned Scott

Category:New Mexico State Register of Cultural Properties

Churches in Taos County, New Mexico
Spanish missions in New Mexico
National Historic Landmarks in New Mexico
Churches on the National Register of Historic Places in New Mexico
Historic American Buildings Survey in New Mexico
Northern Rio Grande National Heritage Area
Roman Catholic churches completed in 1815
National Register of Historic Places in Taos County, New Mexico
Adobe churches in New Mexico
19th-century Roman Catholic church buildings in the United States